For a given set of taxa like X, and a set of splits S on X, usually together with a non-negative weighting, which may represent character changes distance, or may also have a more abstract interpretation, if the set of splits S is compatible, then it can be represented by an unrooted phylogenetic tree and each edge in the tree corresponds to exactly one of the splits. More generally, S can always be represented by a split network, which is an unrooted phylogenetic network with the property that every split s in S is represented by an array of parallel edges in the network.

A split network N can be obtained from a number of different types of data:
Split networks from distances
Split networks from trees
Split networks from sequences
Split networks from quartets

References

Further reading
 
 

Phylogenetics
Evolutionary biology